Taenite is a mineral found naturally on Earth mostly in iron meteorites.

The name is derived from the Greek ταινία for "band, ribbon". Taenite is a major constituent of iron meteorites. In octahedrites it is found in bands interleaving with kamacite forming Widmanstätten patterns, whereas in ataxites it is the dominant constituent. In octahedrites a fine intermixture with kamacite can occur, which is called plessite.

Taenite is one of four known Fe-Ni meteorite minerals: The others are kamacite, tetrataenite, and antitaenite.

Properties
It is opaque with a metallic grayish to white color. The structure is isometric-hexoctahedral (cubic). Its density is around 8 g/cm3 and hardness is 5 to 5.5 on the Mohs scale. Taenite is magnetic, in contrast to antitaenite. The structure is isometric-hexoctahedral (cubic). The crystal lattice has the c≈a= 3.582±0.002 Å. The Strunz classification is I/A.08-20, while the Dana classification is 1.1.11.2.

Meteorite localities with taenite
 Campo del Cielo strewn field in Argentina.
 Henbury Meteorites Conservation Reserve in Australia.
 Canyon Diablo in Arizona.

See also
 Glossary of meteoritics
 List of minerals

References 

Mason B., 1962: Meteorites. J. Wiley & Sons, New York 

Iron minerals
Nickel minerals
Meteorite minerals
Magnetic minerals
Cubic minerals
Minerals in space group 225
Native element minerals
Nickel alloys
Ferroalloys